For Your Consideration is a 2008 comedy album recorded by American stand-up comedian Kathy Griffin. The album was recorded at the Grand Theatre Center for the Arts in Tracy, California on February 17, 2008. It is Griffin's first audio-only release of her stand-up material. Included on the disc are her takes on various celebrities and her personal life. Griffin stated that she decided to release this CD to try to win a Grammy award. For Your Consideration received a Grammy nomination for Best Comedy Album, but lost to George Carlin's It's Bad for Ya.

Promotion

In the Spring of 2008, a billboard for the album was placed on Sunset Blvd. Various print advertisements for bus stops, magazines and newspaper circulated from April 2008 to the release date of the album. The theme of the advertisements featured Griffin in a red carpetesque gown desperate for media attention (for which she is famously known). The album also gained its own episode on Griffin's reality show, titled "For Your (Grammy) Consideration".

Commercial performance
The album debuted on the U.S. Billboard 200 at #85, making it the highest-ranked album by a female comedian since 1983, when Joan Rivers reached number 22 with What Becomes a Semi-Legend Most? . The album also debuted at #1 on Top Comedy Albums, making her the first female comedian to do so since the chart began in 2004.

Track listing

Personnel
Adapted from AllMusic.

Production
 Kathy Griffin — Executive producer; performer
 Christian Stavros — Producer
 Louie Teran — Mastering
 Jacob Feinberg-Pyne — Engineer

Visuals and imagery
 David Bett — Art Direction
 Michelle Holme — Art Direction

Chart positions

Release history

For Your Consideration Tour
To further promote the album, Griffin embarked on an American tour titled "For Your Consideration Tour". The tour began in May 2008 in Hawaii and ended in December 2008 in Los Angeles.

Tour dates

References

External links

2008 live albums
Kathy Griffin albums
Stand-up comedy albums
Live comedy albums
Spoken word albums by American artists
2000s comedy albums